Ion Ion may refer to:

 Ion Ion (footballer), a former Romanian footballer
 Ion Aircraft Ion, a two-seat, twin boom, pusher configuration light aircraft